Safran Electronics & Defense, formerly known as Sagem Défense Sécurité, is a French company specializing in optronics, avionics and electronic systems, as well as software for civil and military applications in the naval, aeronautical and space sectors. It is one of the ten entities that make up the Safran Group.

History 
The Société d’applications générales d’électricité et de mécanique (SAGEM) was created in 1925. The company's products ranged from inertial navigation systems to fax machines. SAGEM also manufactured precision equipment for the French Navy: gyrocompasses, fire-control units, optronic equipment.

In 2005, SAGEM merged with the French company "Société nationale d'étude et de construction de moteurs d'aviation (SNECMA)" to form the Safran Group. Within this framework, SAGEM's activities merged with the company Sagem Défense Sécurité. In 2007, the security applications were separated off and a new company named Sagem Sécurité was created (now called Morpho). The Safran Electronics division was created in 2009, grouping together all Safran's electronic engineers. In 2011, the facility in Tarbes (south-west France), which manufactured components for the Megajoule Laser, was sold to the Alcen Group. The question of whether to merge or exchange activities with the Thales Group was regularly raised between 2004 and 2011.

On 1 January 2012, the facility in Fougères (France), formerly Sagem Industries, merged with Sagem Défense Sécurité. In the same year, Thales and Sagem acquired Areva's stake in Sofradir. Sagem owns 50% of this subsidiary which is a European leader in infrared detectors. In July, the two companies announced the creation of OPTROLEAD, a 50/50 joint-venture company working in the field of optronics.

In January 2013, the facility in Saint-Pierre-du-Perray (France) became a fully owned subsidiary of Safran Electronics & Defense. The company focuses on designing and manufacturing high-performance optics for space, astronomy, high-power lasers and the semiconductor industry.

In 2013, Sagem announced the opening of a factory in Casablanca (Morocco) to produce components for actuators and avionics equipment. On 19 May 2016, all the Group's companies took the name of Safran, and Sagem became Safran Electronics & Defense. At the end of that year, the company grouped together all its R&D and R&T activities in the north-west of Paris on the Éragny site.

The company has been headed up by the following directors (in chronological order): Jacques Paccard, Jean-Paul Herteman (appointed in November 2006), Jean-Lin Fournereaux (September 2007), Philippe Petitcolin (June 2011), Bruno Even (May 2013) and Martin Sion (June 2015).

In November 2022, it was announced Safran Electronics & Defense had acquired the Cesson-Sévigné-based space sector radio-communication and radio-navigation company, Syrlinks.

Organization 
The company has three divisions: Avionics, Optronics & Defense and Safran Electronics. Today, it has nine facilities in France and twelve subsidiaries spread across four continents.

Activity 
Safran Electronics & Defense is a technology company that develops civil and military solutions for sea, land, air and space applications.

For example, in the field of optronics, the company developed the non-penetrating periscope for the Barracuda submarine, the FELIN system (an integrated infantry soldier combat suite), infrared scope and cameras for helicopters and tanks, as well as the Sperwer and Patroller drone systems.

In terms of avionics, the company provides numerous types of equipment, ranging from the electric flight control system for the NH90 helicopter to the information system for the Airbus A380, as well as inertial navigation systems and engine control systems.

Finally, in the space sector, Safran manufactures high-performance space optics used on satellites such as MeteoSat and Gaia.

Gallery

References 

French companies established in 2004
Electronics companies of France